Duksfjorden is an fjord arm that branches off the main Kamøyfjorden on the eastern side of the island of Magerøya in Nordkapp Municipality in Troms og Finnmark county, Norway.

The mouth of the inlet spans between Bryggnæringen in the north and the island of Store Kamøya in the south. Just beside Store Kamøya lies the island of Lille Kamøya and south of this lies the village of Kamøyvær.

Risfjorden
Between the island of Magerøya itself and Lille Kamøya, the little fjord of Risfjorden branches off the Duksfjorden and runs south, past Kamøyvær and the hamlet of Kuvika.

See also
 List of Norwegian fjords

References

Fjords of Troms og Finnmark
Magerøya
Nordkapp